The 2023 UCI Cycling Esports World Championships was the third edition of the UCI Cycling Esports World Championships, the annual world championships for esport road bicycle racing. It was held on 18 February 2022 on the platform Zwift on a specially designed, Scotland inspired course.

Loes Adegeest prolongued her world title in the women's race by winning the final sprint of 3 riders. The men's race was won by Bjørn Andreassen. He jumped ahead at the very start of the last race and managed to keep a gap until the finish.

Elimination format 
The format of the 2023 championships was changed into a three-race elimination series. Qualifying races were held in November 2022 in order to select 100 riders for each race. The February championships were divided into three 25 minute races with short breaks in between them. The first part The Punch started with the whole 100 rider peloton. The first 30 riders competed in the second part The Climb and raced for the 10 places in the finale elimination criterium called The Podium. At every half of the course one rider was eliminated until 3 riders remained and sprinted for the medals at the finish line.

Results

Men's Race

Women's race

External links 
 
  Includes race description, print screens and official results.

References